High Ceilings & Collarbones is the debut studio album by Spanish singer, songwriter and musician Juan Zelada. It was first released on 2 December 2011 in the United Kingdom. The album peaked to number 53 on the UK Albums Chart.

Track listing

Chart performance

Release history

References 

2012 albums
Juan Zelada albums
European Border Breakers Award-winning albums